The 1989 South Pacific Mini Games were held at Nuku'alofa in Tonga from 22 August to 1 September 1989. It was the third edition of the South Pacific Mini Games.

Tonga's national stadium, the Teufaiva Sport Stadium, was built for the Games on the previous site of the agricultural showgrounds. The stadium, new Atele gymnasium, and tennis courts, were built or refurbished with the aid of Taiwan and France. The venues were eventually completed just in time for the games following some controversy in the preceding months with the construction alarmingly behind schedule.

Participating countries
Sixteen Pacific nations participated in the Games:

Note: A number in parentheses indicate the size of a country's team (where known).

Sports
The six sports contested at the 1989 South Pacific Mini Games were:

 
   
 

 
 
 

Note: A number in parentheses indicates how many medal events were contested in that sport (where known).

Final medal table
Western Samoa topped the medal count:

See also
Athletics at the 1989 South Pacific Mini Games

Notes
 Western Samoa won six gold medals in the boxing competition that captured the local people's imagination – as reported by Pacific islands Monthly, "it seemed half of Nuku'alof was crammed into the indoor stadium".

 Golf: Fiji, captained by Adi Sainimili Tuivanuavou, won the women's team bronze at the 1989 South Pacific Mini Games.

 Netball: Cook Islands won the competition, defeating PNG by 53–49 in the final. Fiji did not play in the tournament.

 Nauru's 18-year-old Marcus Stephens broke all three South Pacific Games records in the 60 kg weightlifting class.

References

Sources

Pacific Games by year
Pacific Games
Pacific Games
 
1989 in Tongan sport
International sports competitions hosted by Tonga
Pacific Mini Games
Pacific Mini Games